Bedrich Formánek (born 6 June 1933) is a Slovak chess composer.

In 1990 Bedrich Formánek gained the title FIDE Master for Chess Compositions. He is also International Judge for Chess Compositions since 1966, qualified for sections #2, #3, #n, h#.

Bedrich Formánek was a long-time delegate for Czechoslovakia and later for Slovakia in Permanent Commission of the FIDE for Chess Compositions (PCCC), serving in years 1994-2002 as PCCC President, becoming an honorary president of the current WFCC afterwards. Bedrich Formánek is well known for long-time editing chess composition columns in newspapers in Slovakia, such as Pravda, Práca, Smena and many other.

References

External links
 Formánek's problems at the PDB Server

1933 births
Living people
Slovak chess players
Chess composers